Dede Suhendar Dinata (born 14 December 1969) is an Indonesian former professional tennis player.

A native of Bogor, Suhendar Dinata had a best singles ranking on the professional tour of 603 in the world, featuring mostly at satellite and Futures level. He was a quarter-finalist at the 1991 Jakarta Challenger.

Suhendar Dinata, who won two bronze medals at the 1991 Southeast Asian Games, was an occasional member of the Indonesia Davis Cup team. He played in a total of four singles rubbers, two in 1992 and two more in 1998.

See also
List of Indonesia Davis Cup team representatives

References

External links
 
 
 

1969 births
Living people
Indonesian male tennis players
Competitors at the 1991 Southeast Asian Games
Southeast Asian Games medalists in tennis
Southeast Asian Games bronze medalists for Indonesia
People from Bogor
Sportspeople from West Java
Medalists at the 1991 Summer Universiade
Universiade bronze medalists for Indonesia
Universiade medalists in tennis